Lillian "Curly" Lawrence (September 27, 1883 – November 4, 1967), known as LBSC, was one of Britain's most prolific and well known model or scale-steam-locomotive designers. LBSC were the initials of Britain's London, Brighton and South Coast Railway, where he was once employed as a fireman.

Early life 
LBSC, "Curly" to his friends, was born 27 September 1883 and christened William Morris Benjamin, later changing his surname to Mathieson when his father changed the family name. After 1902, he changed his name to Lillian Lawrence; why he chose a female name is unclear, however he was nicknamed "Dolly" at school by account of his long, blond, curly hair, and was pictured on occasion, wearing female shoes and clothing while driving his models. Despite his 'unusual make-up', as described by his friend George Barlow, his retiring nature, and the prejudices that may have existed in 1930s, he was readily accepted as an expert live steam model engineer. Lawrence had been making steam engines from tins and bits and pieces since childhood and his engineering skills were largely self taught. In 1908 he married Sarah Munt, otherwise known as Mabel. Lawrence loved steam locomotives from the time he was a child and spent several years in the employ of the LBSC Railway, from which he later adopted his pen name.

Battle of the boilers
The turning point in LBSC's life was in 1922 when he sparked what became known as the "battle of the boilers" with Henry Greenly. Within two and half years he was established as one of the top professionals in scale or model engineering. LBSC's contention was that scale locomotives should be fitted with fire-tube boilers modeled very closely on full size locomotive practice i.e. be coal fired, with multiple fire-tubes and a number of superheater elements, as compared with then commercial and hobbyist practice of building spirit fuelled, water-tube boilers.

LBSC's live steam locomotive type boilers proved to be outstanding steamers, quite capable of hauling real passengers. His 2½ inch gauge four coupled wheel locomotive, Ayesha (named after a character in the novel She: A History of Adventure by H. Rider Haggard), could haul 200 lb, when the equivalent sized spirit fired water-tube locomotives of the day could only haul 30 lb. LBSC demonstrated this locomotive at the Society of Model & Experimental Engineers meeting in London in July 1922, as a result of which he was invited to contribute an article to Model Engineer magazine describing its construction. A further challenge in 1924 – the "battle of the boilers" – between a Henry Greenly designed Bassett-Lowke spirit fired locomotive and one of LBSC's finally vindicated his claims although it led to a lifelong animosity between him and Greenly.  Ayesha, now owned by The National 2½ in Gauge Association, was steamed in June 2016 for the first time in more than 50 years, and after little more than a hydraulic boiler test, ran successfully more than 90 years after the locomotive was built by LBSC. To see photos of this historic locomotive see John Baguley's website

Writing
LBSC then wrote construction articles for various British model engineering magazines from 1923 until 1967, very shortly before his death, including nearly 2,600 articles for Model Engineer Magazine from January 1922 (initially in the form of letters to the Editor and then from April 1923 as a full-time contributor) to May 1959 and then again from January 1966 until October 1967. During this time, LBSC designed 166 different locomotives, ranging from 0 gauge up to 5 inch gauge, building over 50 himself. Many of these designs are still available today as sets of drawings, and some were later produced in book form,

Track gauges

Before LBSC started publishing in the 1920s, model locomotive practice had been divided into two camps. The first encompassed steam locomotives that ran on a gauge of 10¼ inch or greater which followed full scale practice in terms of boiler design and operation, as exemplified by the 15 inch gauge, Henry Greenly designed Romney, Hythe and Dymchurch Railway in Kent. The second encompassed locomotives that were of 2½ inch gauge or less which truly were models i.e. were meant only to look like full size locomotives and ran with spirit fired boilers, typified by those manufactured by Bassett-Lowke. These latter locomotives were usually run in realistic looking garden railway layouts hauling groups of model carriages around the track. The gauges between 2½ and 10¼ inch essentially did not exist. The advent of LBSC's designs that could haul their full size drivers, although a lot less realistic than a "model" railway, were much more fun. As the design of true locomotive type boilers in the smaller scales (0, 1¾ and 2½ inch gauges) improved, so the scale increased with many designs then being built to the larger 3½, 5 and 7¼ inch gauges. This is reflected in the spread of LBSC's designs; in the 1920s he did 27 designs in the smaller scales versus only 1 of 3½ inch or larger, in the 1930s 50 designs in the smaller scales versus 7 in the larger, in the 1940s 17 versus 19, 1950s 10 versus 21 and finally in the 1960s 2 versus 5. Within model engineering circles other well known contemporary British designer / builders in these mid-size gauges included Harry Jackson and Harry Clarkson.

Legacy
It was LBSC's contention that any person with enough desire could build a working steam locomotive. Many of his designs were based on actual engines, though they were usually modified and often simplified for the home builder. All were robust in nature and good performers. His notes on various aspects of locomotive construction were compiled into a book called Shops, Shed, and Road, first published in 1929 and still considered to be a standard reference for the model engineer (republished in 1950 as The Live Steam Book and in 1969 as LBSC's Shop, Shed and Road with singular Shop). Through his articles LBSC introduced many enthusiasts to the joys of machine shop work and miniature steam locomotives. "An enigmatic character, not to mention one who had almost no ability to tolerate criticism of his work, he nevertheless had a natural empathy with his readers and a remarkable knack of making the most complicated workshop procedures sound utterly straightforward". There are countless locomotives built to his plans still operating on tracks around the world. He died on 4 November 1967 having made his last contribution to Model Engineer Magazine only one month before. LBSC's legacy includes 113 published and 29 unpublished designs, including some of the most popular ones as follows.

2½ inch gauge
 Annie Boddie, Midland Railway style 4-4-0 tender engine, Model Engineer, 1933
 Austere Ada, War Department Austerity 2-8-0 tender engine, Model Engineer, 1943
 Ayesha, LB&SCR Atlantic 4-4-2 tender engine, the locomotive which initiated the Battle of the Boilers in 1924, English Mechanics, 1930
 Canadian Switcher, Canadian National style 0-6-0 Switcher tank engine, Model Engineer, 1929
 Caterpillar, LBSC's freelance 4-12-2 tender engine design based on the Union Pacific 9000 Class with 3 or 4 cylinders, English Mechanics, 1932
 Fayette, Anglo-American 4-6-2 Pacific tender engine, Model Engineer, 1928
 Green Arrow, LNER V2, 2-6-2 tender engine. 3 cylinders with Holcroft conjugated valve gear, English Mechanics, 1936
 GWR 1695, GWR, open cab 0-6-0ST saddle tank engine, English Mechanics, 1939
 Helen Long, LBSC freelance 4-8-4T express tank engine design with 3 cylinders, Model Engineer, 1927
 Kingette, GWR King Class 4-6-0 4 cylinder tender engine, Model Engineer, 1932
 Lady Kitty, GWR 4700 Class, 2-8-0 tender engine, Model Engineer, 1929
 LMS 4652, LMS Fowler Class 4F, 0-6-0 tender engine, English Mechanics, 1937
 Mabel Hall, GWR Hall Class, 4-6-0 tender engine, English Mechanics, 1932
 Mary Anne, LNER Class J39, 0-6-0 tender engine, Model Engineer, 1934
 Olympiade, LMS Jubilee Class, 4-6-0 tender engine, Model Engineer, 1938
 Princess Royal, LMS Princess Class, 4-6-2 Pacific tender engine, English Mechanics, 1933
 Purley Grange, GWR Grange Class, 4-6-0 tender engine, Model Engineer, 1937
 Rose, GER Class T26, 2-4-0 tender engine, Model Engineer, 1957
 Uranus, GWR style 4-8-4 tender engine, English Mechanics, 1932
 US Austerity, American style WWII Austerity, 2-8-0 tender engine, English Mechanics, 1943

3½ inch gauge
 Betty, LBSC's might-have-been Maunsell type SR 2-6-2 tender engine, subsequently published in book form, British Model Maker, 1956
 Britannia, BR Class 7 4-6-2 Pacific tender engine. LBSC used much information made available to him by his friend Robert Riddles during his development of the full-size engine, Model Engineer 1951
 BR 75000, British Railways 4-6-0 class 4 tender engine, the last design LBSC did for English Mechanics magazine, English Mechanics 1956
 Canterbury Lamb, Canterbury and Whitstable Railway, 0-4-0 tender engine of 1830, Model Engineer, 1952
 Evening Star, BR standard class 9F 2-10-0 freight tender engine, the last steam engine built for BR, LBSC's design was completed by Martin Evans, subsequently published in book form, Practical Mechanics 1963
 Hielan Lassie, Thompson rebuild of the LNER A1/1 Pacific tender engine. Described with slide or piston valves and both Walschaerts and Baker valve gear, Model Engineer, 1946
 Ivy Hall, LBSC's "modernised" GWR Hall Class, 4-6-0 tender engine, Model Engineer, 1955
 Juliet, beginner's 0-4-0 tank engine, Model Engineer, 1946
 Lickham Hall, Authentic reproduction of GWR Hall Class 4-6-0 tender engine. Designed for Reeves in 1956
 Maisie, Great Northern C1 Atlantic 4-4-2 tender engine, subsequently published in book form, Model Engineer, 1935
 Mona, LNER 0-6-2T style tank engine, with inside cylinders and Hackworth valve gear, subsequently published in book form, British Model Maker, 1956/57. Also for 1.75" gauge.
 Miss Ten-to-Eight, North Eastern R1 (later LNER D21 class) 4-4-0 tender engine, Model Engineer, 1939
 Molly, LMS Fowler Class 3F tank engine 0-6-0 "Jinty", Model Engineer, 1941
 Netta, North Eastern T1 (later LNER Q5 class) 0-8-0 tender engine, described simultaneously in gauge O, 1¾, 2½, 3½  and 5-inch gauges, Model Engineer, 1954
 Pamela, LBSC's idea for rebuilding the SR Merchant Navy class 4-6-2 Pacific tender engine, Model Engineer, 1950
 Petrolea, Great Eastern T19 (later LNER E4 class) 2-4-0 inside cylinder tender engine, Model Engineer, 1943
 Princess Marina, LMS Stanier Mogul 2-6-0 tender engine, subsequently published in book form, English Mechanics 1935
 P.V. Baker, 0-6-0T tank engine. Piston Valve, Baker valve gear, Model Engineer, 1945
 Rainhill, 0-2-2 tender engine inspired by Stephenson's Rocket in its original form, Model Engineer, 1941
 Tich, 0-4-0T LBSC's freelance contractor's tank engine designed with both small and large-boilers, with slip-eccentric or Walschaerts valve gear, subsequently published in book form, Model Engineer, 1948 & 1959
 Virginia, 4-4-0 American tender engine, described in both "old time" and modern guises, subsequently published in book form, Model Engineer, 1956

5-inch gauge
 Eva May, 0-6-0T freelance tank engine. LBSC's first 5-inch design. There was a tender version as well, English Mechanics 1933
 Maid of Kent, 4-4-0 tender engine, a South Eastern & Chatham Railway L1 class, Model Engineer, 1948
 Minx, London, Brighton & South Coast Railway C2x 0-6-0 tender engine, Model Engineer, 1948
 Pansy, GWR 0-6-0PT pannier tank engine, Model Engineer, 1958
 Speedy, GWR 15xx 0-6-0T tank engine, subsequently published in book form, English Mechanics 1950
 Titfield Thunderbolt, 0-4-2 tender engine based on the Liverpool & Manchester Railway's "Lion", Model Engineer, 1953

Published books

See also
 Model engineering
 Martin Evans
 Rideable miniature railway

References

Locomotive builders and designers
1883 births
1967 deaths
Model engineers